Les Rencontres d'Aubrac is a French literary festival. This event has taken place every last weekend of August in Aubrac, Aveyron, France since 1994.

History 

Les Rencontres d'Aubrac is an event aimed both at a specialized and a non-specialized public. The program (see the 2010 program here) is a mix between scientific lectures and films, theatre shows, and other forms of expressions such as workshops with the participation of the public.

Each year, a new theme is chosen among key themes of the French literature.

Themes chosen from the beginning of the Rencontres d'Aubrac:

 Jean Giono, Julien Gracq in 1994
 Charles-Ferdinand Ramuz in 1995
 Henri Pourrat in 1996
 Alexandre Vialatte in 1997
 Littérature de sanatorium in 1998
 Génie conteur du Nord (de l’Islande à l’Estonie) in 1999
 Récits d’aventures sur les routes médiévales européennes in 2001
 Aubracadabra : Qu’est-ce qu’un conte populaire ? in 2003
 Aubracadabra : Figures du fantastique dans les contes et nouvelles in 2004
 Dire les Mythes in 2005
 Dire les Mythes (nouvelle édition) in 2006
 Les mythes et les contes ont-ils encore un sens ? in 2007
 Dire l'Interdit dans les contes, nouvelles, poèmes, chansons, films in 2008
 Voyage en Absurdie in 2009
 Vertige de l'Imposture in 2010

Complete list of programs

Rencontres d'Aubrac in video 

The Rencontres d'Aubrac are filmed by the MSH, within the project AAR (archives audiovisuelles de la recherche). All the lectures are available in video, indexed content, here.

External links
 Rencontres d'Aubrac website 

Tourist attractions in Aveyron
Literary festivals in France
Recurring events established in 1994